Sandnes District Court was a district court in Rogaland county, Norway. The court was based at the Sandnes Courthouse located on Olav V's plass in the town of Sandnes. The court existed from until 2021. It had jurisdiction over the municipalities of Gjesdal and Sandnes. Cases from this court could be appealed to Gulating Court of Appeal.

The court was a court of first instance. Its judicial duties were mainly to settle criminal cases and to resolve civil litigation as well as bankruptcy. The administration and registration tasks of the court included death registration, issuing certain certificates, performing duties of a notary public, and officiating civil wedding ceremonies. Cases from this court were heard by a combination of professional judges and lay judges.

History
This court was established on 24 February 1967, when parts of the Jæren District Court and Ryfylke District Court were used to create this new court. Initially, the court's geographical jurisdiction came from the municipalities of Høyland, Sandnes, and Hetland (which came from the Jæren District Court) and Høle and Gjesdal (which came from the Ryfylke District Court). On 1 September 2006, a major change to the district courts in the region took place. The Sandnes District Court was closed and merged into the Jæren District Court which moved the site of the court from Bryne in Time Municipality to the town of Sandnes. Additionally on that date, the old Ryfylke District Court was also dissolved and Forsand municipality was transferred into the jurisdiction of the Jæren District Court.

References

Defunct district courts of Norway
Organisations based in Sandnes
1967 establishments in Norway
2006 disestablishments in Norway